Renée C. Harris is an American singer, dancer, and actress. Her career was launched as an 18-year-old with the role of Dorothy Gale in the touring version of The Wiz.

Discography
"Doctor Music"	released with B-side "Yesterday Girl" in Germany 1977
"I Close My Eyes And Count To Ten", B-side "It's Morning" 1978

References

Living people
Year of birth missing (living people)
Place of birth missing (living people)
20th-century American women singers
20th-century American singers
20th-century American actresses